Small nucleolar RNA, C/D box 9 is a protein that in humans is encoded by the SNORD9 gene.

References